The Lighthouse Tower is a supertall, commercial skyscraper to be built in Dubai, United Arab Emirates designed by multi-national architectural firm Atkins. It will be constructed in the DIFC, is set rise to 402 m (1,319 feet) and have 64 floors. The tower is a Green Building with a huge emphasis put on reducing its carbon footprint and conserving energy.

The tower rises as two separate towers, bridged from level 10, all the way up to approximately 300 meters above ground. The structure is to hold a number of skygardens. Construction was suspended in 2009.

Environmental aspects
There will be three large 225 kW wind turbines, 29 meters in diameter, on the building's south facing side in order to generate electricity. These turbines will have the freedom to yaw, in order to maximize power generation. It will also be clad in 4,000 solar panels to generate additional electricity.  The tower will also reduce its overall energy consumption by 65%, and its water consumption by 40% in comparison to an equivalent building. At the building's base, a four story glass lobby will house an environmental visitor center. It was designed by the Atkins group.

See also
List of tallest buildings in Dubai
Pearl River Tower
WS Atkins

Notes

References
Emporis.com

Proposed skyscrapers in Dubai